Pink purslane is a common name for several flowering plants, including:

Claytonia sibirica, a plant native to Siberia and North America 
Calandrinia calyptrata, a plant native to Australia
Portulaca pilosa, a plant native to parts of North, Central and South America